William Sprigge (1678 – 15 August 1735) was an Irish politician.

Sprigge served in the Irish House of Commons as the Member of Parliament for Tralee between 1723 and 1727. He was then elected to sit for Banagher from 1729 until his death in 1735.

References

1678 births
1735 deaths
Irish MPs 1715–1727
Irish MPs 1727–1760
Members of the Parliament of Ireland (pre-1801) for County Kerry constituencies
Members of the Parliament of Ireland (pre-1801) for King's County constituencies